Joris Van Hout (born 10 January 1977) is a Belgian former professional footballer who played as a forward.

Career
Playing for Borussia Mönchengladbach van Hout scored 11 goals in 69 Bundesliga appearances.

In summer 2005, he left Mönchengladbach for an undisclosed fee to join VfL Bochum on a three-year contract. He made 39 appearances for Bochum in two seasons, with all his six league goals coming in their 2005–06 promotion-winning campaign.

In June 2007, van Hout returned to his home country Belgium agreeing to a four-year contract with Westerlo.

Honours
Anderlecht
Belgian Super Cup: 2001

References

External links
 
 

1977 births
Living people
People from Mol, Belgium
Footballers from Antwerp Province
Belgian footballers
Association football forwards
Belgium international footballers
Belgian Pro League players
Bundesliga players
2. Bundesliga players
K.F.C. Dessel Sport players
K.V.C. Westerlo players
R.S.C. Anderlecht players
K.V. Mechelen players
Borussia Mönchengladbach players
VfL Bochum players
Belgian expatriate footballers
Belgian expatriate sportspeople in Germany
Expatriate footballers in Germany